The Pitts Model 12 (also known by its nicknames "Bolshoi", "Macho Stinker", "Pitts Monster") is a high performance aerobatic biplane designed around the Vedeneyev M14P/PF engine. The aircraft can be built from plans or as a kitplane, or can be bought ready-to-fly from the factory.

Design and development
The Pitts model 12 was designed by Curtis Pitts starting in 1993. Pitts presented his completed design on his 80th birthday in December 1995.

The Pitts Model 12 is a biplane built using fabric covered welded steel tubing for the fuselage, and fabric covered wings with wood spars. The leading edge is made of formed plywood. The landing gear is solid aluminum.

Operational history
, 59 examples had been completed and flown.

Variants
There are several model variants:

Plans built
HP model - kit
Model 12S - factory built
A single place variant has been constructed by Jim Kimball Enterprises called "The Beast".

Specifications (Pitts Model 12)

References

External links

Homebuilt aircraft
Pitts aircraft
Single-engined tractor aircraft
Biplanes
Aerobatic aircraft